Utricularia troupinii is a small, probably annual, carnivorous plant that belongs to the genus Utricularia. It is endemic to Burundi and Rwanda. It was originally described and published by Peter Taylor in 1971, but was identified in 1964 by Taylor as a possible short spurred form of U. welwitschii.

See also 
 List of Utricularia species

References 

Carnivorous plants of Africa
Flora of Burundi
Flora of Rwanda
troupinii